NA-16 (Abbottabad-I) is a constituency for the National Assembly of Pakistan. The constituency was formerly known as NA-17 (Abbottabad-I) from 1977 to 2018. The name changed to NA-16 (Abbottabad-II) after the delimitation in 2018 and to NA-16 (Abbottabad-I) after the delimitation in 2022.

Members of Parliament

1977–2002: NA-17 (Abbottabad-I)

2002–2018: NA-17 (Abbottabad-I)

2018-2022: NA-16 (Abbottabad-II)

Elections since 2002

2002 general election

A total of 3,375 votes were rejected.

2008 general election

A total of 2,681 votes were rejected.

2013 general election

A total of 3,932 votes were rejected.

2018 general election 

General elections were held on 25 July 2018.

By-election 2023 
A by-election will be held on 19 March 2023 due to the resignation of Ali Khan Jadoon, the previous MNA from this seat.

See also
NA-15 Mansehra-cum-Torghar
NA-17 Abbottabad-II

References

External links 
 Election result's official website

16
16